Bigg Boss Kannada (BBK) is the Kannada version of the reality TV show Bigg Boss which is broadcast in India through Colors Kannada Channel. The show is produced by Endemol Shine India, who owns the global format of Big Brother. Kiccha Sudeepa was hired to host the reality show in 2013 for the first season on ETV Kannada (now Colors Kannada). Later, he continued as a host of the show.

Overview

The 'Bigg Boss' house 
A 'Bigg Boss' House is constructed for every season. For the first two seasons, the house was located in Lonavala, Pune district of Maharashtra, where the Hindi version of Bigg Boss usually takes place. As the schedules for the Hindi and Kannada versions were expected to be overlapped, a house exclusive for Kannada version of the show was built at Innovative Film City in Bengaluru, Karnataka for the third season. This continues to be the location of the house for the next seasons of Bigg Boss Kannada as well. The house built for a season of Bigg Boss is retained until the start of next season and is open for public at the venue, serving as an attraction.

The house would be usually well-furnished and decorated. It would have all the modern amenities and a large, common bedroom with beds for all contestants. There was an addition in the form of a luxurious single bedroom for the captain starting from second season. The house would also have common toiletries, swimming pool, gymnasium and spacious gardens. Apart from these, show specific activity areas and a small sound-proof room with controlled entrance called as the 'confession room' is built in the house where the housemates would be called in by the Bigg Boss for nomination process and other conversational activities. A secret room with bed and other facilities was incorporated into the house starting from season 2 where an evicted contestant, if selected by the Bigg Boss to continue the game, would be retained in this room for a week or two and would be put back into the game.

The House has no television connection (except for the day where the show host Sudeep converses with the contestants through the TV), no telephones, no access to internet, no clocks, no articles to write, complying with the rules of Big Brother around the world.

The house was completely reduced to ashes on 22 February 2018, and had to be rebuilt for the sixth season.

The 'Eye' logo
Each season gets its own 'Eye' logo similar to the Bigg Boss and Big Brother shows. The first season of Bigg Boss Kannada on ETV Kannada inherited its logo from the sixth season of its Hindi counterpart in the form of a human eye with an eyeball displaying the SMPTE color bars, against a purple background with lightning storm. The second season, moved to Suvarna TV and got its dedicated logo in the form of a more detailed human eye against a background which split the 'hot' (orange) and 'cold' (blue) sides of the personalities in the house. This logo also had the text 'Season 2' inserted below the 'Eye'. The third season returned to the previous broadcaster, then re-branded as Colors Kannada and the logo was adopted from the one used for the first season. The same eye was used against a purple background with a tornado and the season number was not mentioned. Season numbers were omitted to be a part of the logo from this season.

The fourth season had a make-over with the new 'Eye' that resembled a futuristic design, with different elements inside the eye, against a background that uses tech elements and logos from previous season on a dominant blue color. This logo was partially derived from the eye used for the 15th Season of Big Brother UK. The logo used for the 5th Season of Bigg Boss Kannada was adapted from 14th Season of Big Brother UK; shows a pile of old-generation television sets displaying the SMPTE bars hanging at the center from the top, surrounded by multicolored doors, cupboards, lights and windows forming the shape of an eye against a background of an overcast sky with half blue and half brownish orange shade with fireworks behind the eye. For the 6th season, an 'ice-fire' theme was adopted for the logo while the 7th season's logo was adapted from 20th Season of Celebrity Big Brother UK.

House rules
While all the rules have never been disclosed to the audience, the most prominent ones are clearly seen. The inmates should talk in Kannada at all times however, minimal use of English is allowed. The property of the house including the electronic equipment and the furniture should not be tampered or damaged by the housemates. The housemates can not leave the house premises at any time except when permitted to. Sleeping during the day time is prohibited and the contestants are allowed to sleep only when the lights go off in the night. Liquor is abandoned and the housemates with smoking habits can only smoke in the smoking area and are not allowed to smoke in any other parts of the house. A housemate can not assault another housemate physically; failing to follow this rule would result in Elimination of the assaulter from the house.

Nomination
Nomination is a mandatory activity, usually taking place on first day of the week in which all housemates need to take part unless directed by Bigg Boss. Each housemate nominates two other housemates for eviction. Housemates getting maximum nomination votes will be nominated for eviction from the house in that week and undergoes public vote (through SMS) for retention. On the weekend episode, usually one contestant with lowest public votes will be evicted from the house. A housemate may also be directly nominated for eviction by that week's captain of the house or for other reasons by the Bigg Boss. Housemates who are awarded 'immunity' can not be nominated by other contestants. Immunity is automatically given to the week's captain and can be earned by contestants through winning specific tasks or achieving secret tasks given by Bigg Boss. Sometimes, the captain can make a contestant immune from nomination upon Bigg Boss' direction. The housemates are not allowed to discuss about the nominations or the nomination process with each other.

House captaincy
The captaincy concept was introduced in the second season. A captain is selected for every week by the Bigg Boss through specific tasks or elected by the housemates. A captain will have additional privileges in the form of immunity from nomination for that particular week, exemption from participating in the task activities and a separate bedroom with facilities more than that of other contestants. The captain will be exempted from nomination procedure for his/her captaincy week and will have power to either nominate a housemate directly or make a housemate immune from nomination or rescue a nominated housemate, depending on Bigg Boss' decisions. Captain's main duty is to supervise the weekly task and make sure the conditions and stipulations are met and task is performed well to procure the 'luxury budget' for the next week. Captains should also keep an eye on house rules and may punish a housemate for violating the rules.

Broadcast 
Bigg Boss Kannada is first aired on ETV Kannada and second season aired on Star Suvarna and third and fourth season aired on Colors Kannada and fifth and sixth season aired on Colors Super and seventh season aired on Colors Kannada also can be streamed on Voot. Every day's episodes contain the main happenings of the previous day. Every Sunday episode mainly focuses on an interview of the evicted contestant by the host. For the seventh season the eviction process was changed to Saturday episode which was opposed to previous seasons.

Season's summary

Season 1

The first season of Bigg Boss Kannada was launched in 2013 and derived many of its concepts from the sixth season of the original Bigg Boss including the visual elements and the house itself, with slight alterations. 'Howdu Swami!' ('Yes Sir!') was adopted as the slogan for this season and the theme song for the show was sung by Vijay Prakash. The show was aired on ETV Kannada from Mondays to Saturdays from 8 pm to 9 pm, premiering on 24 March 2013. The tasks and house activities would take place from Mondays to Thursdays following a special episode on Fridays, 'Varada Kathe Kicchana Jothe' ('The Week's Story with Kiccha') in which the show's host Sudeep would appear and carryout the eviction for the week. Sudeep's appearance would continue on the next day's special episode, 'Super Saturday with Sudeep'  where an interview of the evicted contestant and a promotion for an upcoming movie would take place with a celebrity guest on the stage with Sudeep. The programming that included the unseen content, 'Bigg Boss Unseen' was aired from 11 pm to 12 am on weeknights. A marathon of all the episodes of the week would run on Sundays from morning. All the episodes were available online on YouTube and the official website of Bigg Boss Kannada after the original airing. The finale of the show was aired on 30 June 2013. Post conclusion of the season, a spin-off programming 'Bigg Boss Autograph' was aired on the same time-slot which consisted of interviews on the journey of fellow contestants in the show. As of date, the episodes from this season are not available online.

Season 2

The second season moved to Asianet Suvarna and was launched in 2014. A new logo and a house exclusive to the Kannada version were created for this season along with a new theme song, with Vijay Prakash reprising his singing role. The slogan for this season was 'Thamashene Alla!' ('Not a Joke at all!'). The season premiered on 29 June 2014 with many new elements getting introduced, including the house captaincy. The programming was increased by a day to include Sundays and the weekly activities would take place from Mondays to Fridays from this season. Eviction episodes with Sudeep, 'Kicchinca Kathe Kicchana Jothe' ('Igniting Story with Kiccha') was aired on Saturdays followed by special episodes for interviews and movie promotions 'Sakkath Sunday with Sudeep' on Sundays. The unseen content for the season, 'Innu Ide Nodi Swami!' ('There's more to watch, Sir!') was aired from 11 pm to 12 am on weeknights. A marathon of all the episodes of the week would run on Sundays from morning. All the episodes were available online on YouTube and the official website of Suvarna after the original airing. The finale of the show was aired on 5 October 2014. After the season concluded, 'Bigg Boss Autograph' was aired on the same time-slot. As of date, the episodes from this season are not available online.

Season 3

The third season returned to the previous broadcaster, then re-branded to Colors Kannada from ETV Kannada. This was the first season to take place inside Karnataka, in a house bigger than the previous ones, built exclusively for the Kannada version at the Innovative Film City in Bengaluru. The season used many elements including the theme song and the logo with slight modifications from the first season. The season was also the first one to omit unseen content programming and online voting. The season premiered on 25 October 2015 and 'Naatakakke Illi Jaaga Illa!' ('There is no place for drama here!') was the slogan of this season. As with the usual format, the episodes would be aired from Mondays to Sundays, this time an hour later than the previous seasons. The time-slot from the third season has been 9 pm to 10 pm on weeknights. The eviction episode, 'Varada Kathe Kicchana Jothe' ('The Week's Story with Kiccha') returned and was aired on Saturdays and continued with 'Super Sunday with Sudeep' on Sundays. The 'Bigg Boss Autograph' for Season 3 was hosted by Rishika Singh, alumna of the first season of Bigg Boss Kannada. The show's finale was aired on 31 January 2016. The episodes from this season were not available online after the airing, however were later made available on Voot platform.

Season 4

The fourth season was aired on Colors Kannada and Colors Kannada HD and was the first season to broadcast the episodes in high-definition format. 'Kandiro Mukhagala Kanade Iro Mukha!' ('Unseen faces of the seen faces!') was the tagline for this season. The season premiered on 9 October 2016 with the same time-slot as of previous season. The format was same as that of previous season, with the same weekend programming with slight alteration in the Sunday's 'Super Sunday with Sudeepa'. The online voting was omitted for this season too but the unseen content was given more importance and a spin-off programming named 'Bigg Boss Night Shift' was aired on Colors Kannada's sister channel Colors Super from 10 pm to 11 pm every day. This show acted as the supplement for the main show and contained unseen footage with commentary. The spin-off was hosted by Rehman Haseeb, the Bigg Boss alumnus from 3rd Season. Also, on the Viacom 18's OTT platform Voot, two exclusive short-shows (referred to as Voot Shorts) were being streamed; both hosted by Rehman. 'Doddmane Suddi' ('News from the Big House') highlighted the events of the day's show before going on air and 'Theremareya Kathe' ('Story behind the Scenes') showed the unseen footage from the show which are not aired on the original episodes. Rehman also hosted a 30-minute interview about the in-house experience of the evicted contestants every weekend in 'Just Maath Maathalli' ('Just in the Talks'), yet another Voot exclusive show. The show was extended for two weeks and the finale took place on 29 January 2017. The final 14 episodes were aired on Colors Super and the finale was simulcast on Colors Kannada, Colors Kannada HD and Colors Super. The 'Bigg Boss Autograph' for this season was hosted by Niranjan Deshpande, an alumnus from the same season. All the episodes were made available online on Voot platform after original airing.

Season 5

The fifth season was moved to Colors Super and premiered on 15 October 2017. The show duration was increased by 30 minutes from this season and the episodes were aired throughout the week from 8:00 pm to 9:30 pm. The major addition to this season was that the housemates included contestants from the public, selected through audition process along with the celebrities. The format of the show continued to be the same as that of previous seasons while the Sunday's episode had a major change. The 'Super Sunday with Sudeepa' episodes included a special segment called 'Kicchan Time' ('Kiccha's / Kitchen Time'), a cookery show in which Sudeep, the host cooks with the celebrity guests invited for promotions. Unseen content was not aired on TV for this season and was made exclusive to Voot platform with two short-shows 'Unseen Avantara' ('Unseen Nuisance') / 'Unseen Kathegalu' ('Unseen Stories') and 'Deep Agi Nodi' ('Watch it Deep') being produced. There was no tagline for this season and online voting was not included. The episodes in high-definition format were simulcast on Colors Kannada HD. All the episodes and daily highlights were made available on Voot platform after original airing.

Season 6

The sixth season premiered on 21 October 2018. All the episodes and daily highlights were made available on Voot platform after original airing. For this season, the number of auditioned contestants (commoners) increased to half of the housemate population; 9 celebrities and 9 commoners entered the house on the premiere. Integration of the show with Voot deepened with exclusive content for the platform in the form of 'Deep Agi Nodi' ('Watch it Deep'), 'Unseen Kathegalu' ('Unseen Stories'), 'Voot Weekly', 'Voot Fryday','Bigg Inn' and 'Bigg Bang'. 'Bigg Prashne' ('Bigg Question') enabled audience to ask their questions to the fellow contestants through the Voot app and selected questions would be asked by Sudeep on the Saturday episode. A major change was made to the voting for nominated contestants; voting was made exclusive on Voot from this season. Continuing its run on Colors Super, the episodes in high-definition format were simulcast on Colors Kannada HD. All the episodes and daily highlights were made available on Voot platform after original airing.

Season 7

The seventh season was moved back to Colors Kannada and an 'all-celebrity' model was re-introduced for the show. The show premiered on 13 October 2019 and 18 celebrity contestants entered the house. Time-slot was also pushed to 9:00 pm to 10:30 pm with high-definition simulcast on Colors Kannada HD. All the episodes and daily highlights were made available on Voot platform after original airing. Voting continued to be exclusive to Voot platform and exclusive content in the form of 'Deep Agi Nodi' ('Watch it Deep'), 'Unseen Kathegalu' ('Unseen Stories'), 'Bigg Inn', 'Voot Weekly' and 'Voot Fryday' were produced. It was made possible for the audience to choose the Friday task for the contestants through 'Voot Fryday'; audience were also able to record and send a video of themselves sharing their opinions on the fellow contestants through 'Video Vichaara', through the Voot app and selected videos would be shown on the TV inside the Bigg Boss house. Another change was brought to the eviction episode where on the Saturday episode, the saved contestants would be declared, reducing the nominated contestants to 2 or 3 of which one would be evicted on the Sunday episode as opposed to the previous seasons where the evictions used to happen on the Saturday episode.

Series details

Note

Housemate summary

Bigg Boss OTT

The series is also set to roll out a digital version of the show called Bigg Boss OTT, which is also going to be hosted by Sudeepa and broadcast by Voot for 24×7 coverage. The series is set to launch on 6 August 2022 at 7pm. Roopesh Shetty emerged as winner (Show Topper)

Awards and nominations

Sponsorship
Each season has grown in terms of revenue and has attracted prominent brands to sponsor the show. The sponsors receive the privilege of getting their brands advertised on the show, in the house as well as during the commercial breaks. Few tasks on the show would be designed in a way such that the brand gets advertised directly. Household articles such as pillows and coffee mugs would usually contain the branding from the sponsor. The sponsors for the show until date are listed in the table below.

Reception
The first season of the show became popular and turned out to be a TRP magnet, eventually becoming the No.1 reality show in South India.

Bigg Boss Kannada moved to Asianet's Suvarna (now under Star India) for the second season and grew even bigger in the market. The channel claimed an approximate increase of 25% in viewership and 400% in online engagement for the season. The season debuted with 6.7 TVR while averaging 5.7 TVR in its launch week and had a peak rating of 7.9 TVR during the first elimination episode of Saturday.

The show returned to Viacom 18 with Sudeep signing to host the next five seasons. The third season was aired on Colors Kannada (rebranded from ETV Kannada) and witnessed a slight fall in the TRP because of a controversy involving a fellow housemate following his immediate elimination. A year later, during the press meet for the fourth season, it was clarified that the TRP fall was a false claim and the ratings actually went up after the elimination.

The fame of the show as of fourth season reached to an extent where the film producers from the Kannada Film Industry and the Karnataka Film Chamber of Commerce held a protest in front of Innovative Film City in Bidadi, where the Bigg Boss house is located, demanding the actors not to participate or host reality shows on television, also tried to impose a ban on the show because of its popularity affecting the performances of movies in the box office.

The fifth season of the show was aired in Colors Super, the second Kannada GEC by Viacom18 to increase the viewership for the channel. The season premiered on 15 October 2017 and has been the first season to include non-celebrity housemates selected through online audition process. The grand finale was held on 28 and 29 January 2018 and Chandan Shetty emerged as the winner. Season 6 of Bigg Boss premiered on 21 October 2018 in Colors Super. After a successful season the grand finale was aired on 26 and 27 January 2019 and farmer Shashi Kumar emerged as the winner, with runner-up being singer Naveen Sajju, followed by Kavitha Gowda, Andrew Jayapaul and Rapid Rashmi in the 3rd, 4th and 5th place respectively. Sudeep was the host of this season too.

Controversies

References

External links
 

Bigg Boss Kannada
2013 Indian television series debuts
Indian television series based on non-Indian television series
Colors Kannada original programming
Kannada-language television shows